Kalaparru is a village in Eluru district of the Indian state of Andhra Pradesh. It is located in Pedapadu mandal of Eluru revenue division. It is located at a distance of 13 km from district headquarters Eluru city. The nearest train station is Vatlur railway station located at a distance of 3.89 Km.

Demographics 

 Census of India, Kalaparru had a population of 2987. The total population constitutes 1505 males and 1482 females: a sex ratio of 985 females per 1000 males. 274 children are in the age group of 0–6 years, with a child sex ratio of 1015 girls per 1000 boys. The average literacy rate stands at 77.63%. Kalaparru has two entrances. The main entrance is (west) opposite of NH-5 and another entrance is at the back side of the village.

References

Villages in Eluru district